Major-General John Frederick Charles "Boney" Fuller  (1 September 1878 – 10 February 1966) was a senior British Army officer, military historian, and strategist, known as an early theorist of modern armoured warfare, including categorising principles of warfare. With 45 books and many articles, he was a highly prolific author whose ideas reached army officers and the interested public. He explored the business of fighting, in terms of the relationship between warfare and social, political, and economic factors in the civilian sector.  Fuller emphasised the potential of new weapons, especially tanks and aircraft, to stun a surprised enemy psychologically.

Fuller supported the organised British fascist movement.  He was also an occultist and Thelemite who wrote a number of works on esotericism and mysticism.

Early life
Fuller was born in Chichester, West Sussex, the son of an Anglican clergyman.  After moving to Lausanne with his parents as a boy, he returned to England at the age of 11 without them; three years later, at "the somewhat advanced age of 14", he began attending Malvern College and, later trained for an army career at the Royal Military College, Sandhurst, from 1897 to 1898.  His nickname of "Boney", which he was to retain, is said to have come either from an admiration for Napoleon Bonaparte, or from an imperious manner combined with military brilliance which resembled Napoleon's.

Career
Fuller was commissioned into the 1st Battalion of the Oxfordshire Light Infantry (the old 43rd Foot), and served in South Africa from 1899 to 1902.  In the spring of 1904 Fuller was sent with his unit to India, where he contracted typhoid fever in autumn of 1905; he returned to England the next year on sick-leave, where he met the woman he married in December 1906. Instead of returning to India, he was reassigned to Volunteer units in England, serving as adjutant to the 2nd South Middlesex Volunteers (amalgamated into the Kensingtons during the Haldane Reforms) and helping to form the new 10th Middlesex. Fuller later claimed that his position with the 10th Middlesex inspired him to study soldiering seriously. In 1913, he was accepted into the Staff College, Camberley, starting work there in January 1914.

During the First World War, Fuller was a staff officer with the Home Forces and with VII Corps in France, and from 1916 in the Headquarters of the Machine-Gun Corps' Heavy Branch which was later to become the Tank Corps. He helped plan the tank attack at the 20 November 1917 Battle of Cambrai and the tank operations for the Autumn offensives of 1918.  His Plan 1919 for a fully mechanised offensive against the German army was never implemented. After 1918 he held various leading positions, notably as a commander of an experimental brigade at Aldershot.

After the war Fuller collaborated with his junior B. H. Liddell Hart in developing new ideas for the mechanisation of armies, launching a crusade for the mechanisation and modernisation of the British Army. Chief instructor of Camberley Staff College from 1923, he became military assistant to the chief of the Imperial General Staff in 1926.  In what came to be known as the "Tidworth Incident", Fuller turned down the command of the Experimental Mechanized Force, which was formed on 27 August 1927. The appointment also carried responsibility for a regular infantry brigade and the garrison of Tidworth Camp on Salisbury Plain. Fuller believed he would be unable to devote himself to the Experimental Mechanized Force and the development of mechanized warfare techniques without extra staff to assist him with the additional extraneous duties, which the War Office refused to allocate. He was promoted to major-general in 1930 and retired three years later to devote himself entirely to writing.

Retirement
After retirement, Fuller served as a reporter during the Italian invasion of Ethiopia (1935) and the Spanish Civil War (1936–1939). Impatient with what he considered the inability of democracy to adopt military reforms, Fuller became involved with Sir Oswald Mosley and the British fascist movement.  As a member of the British Union of Fascists (BUF), he sat on the party's Policy Directorate and was considered one of Mosley's closest allies. He was also a member of the clandestine far-right group the Nordic League.

Fuller's ideas on mechanised warfare continued to be influential in the lead-up to the Second World War, ironically less with his countrymen than with the Nazis, notably Heinz Guderian who spent his own money to have Fuller's Provisional Instructions for Tank and Armoured Car Training translated. In the 1930s, the German Army implemented tactics similar in many ways to Fuller's analysis, which became known as Blitzkrieg. Like Fuller, theorists of Blitzkrieg partly based their approach on the theory that areas of large enemy activity should be bypassed to be eventually surrounded and destroyed. Blitzkrieg-style tactics were used by several nations throughout the Second World War, predominantly by the Germans in the invasion of Poland (1939), Western Europe (1940), and the Soviet Union (1941). While Germany and to some degree the Western Allies adopted Blitzkrieg ideas, they were not much used by the Red Army, which developed its armored warfare doctrine based on deep operations, which were developed by Soviet military theorists Marshal M. N. Tukhachevsky et al. in the 1920s based on their experiences in the First World War and the Russian Civil War.

Fuller was the only foreigner present at Nazi Germany's first armed manoeuvres in 1935. Fuller frequently praised Adolf Hitler in his speeches and articles, once describing him as "that realistic idealist who has awakened the common sense of the British people by setting out to create a new Germany". On 20 April 1939, Fuller was an honoured guest at Hitler's 50th birthday parade, watching as "for three hours a completely mechanised and motorised army roared past the Führer." Afterwards Hitler asked, "I hope you were pleased with your children?" Fuller replied, "Your Excellency, they have grown up so quickly that I no longer recognise them."

During the Second World War, 1939–1945, Fuller was under suspicion for his Nazi sympathies.  He continued to speak out in favour of a peaceful settlement with Germany.  Alan Brooke (in his war diaries, p. 201) comments that "the Director of Security called on him to discuss Boney Fuller and his Nazi activities", but Brooke commented that he did not think Fuller "had any unpatriotic intentions". Although he was not interned or arrested, he was the only officer of his rank not invited to return to service during the war. There was some suspicion that he was not incarcerated in May 1940 along with other leading officials of the BUF because of his association with General Edmund Ironside and other senior officers. Mosley himself admitted to "a little puzzlement" as to why Fuller had not been imprisoned.

Fuller spent his last years believing that the wrong side had won the Second World War. He most fully announced that thesis in the 1961 edition of The Reformation of War. There, he announced his belief that Hitler was the saviour of the West against the Soviet Union and denounced Churchill and Roosevelt for being too stupid to see so. Fuller died in Falmouth, Cornwall, in 1966.

Military theories
Fuller was a vigorous, expressive, and opinionated writer of military history and of controversial predictions of the future of war, publishing On Future Warfare in 1928.  Seeing his teachings largely vindicated by the Second World War, he published Machine Warfare: An Enquiry into the Influence of Mechanics on the Art of War in 1942.

The Foundations of the Science of War (1926)
Fuller is perhaps best known today for his "Nine Principles of War" which have formed the foundation of much of modern military theory since the 1930s, and which were originally derived from a convergence of Fuller's mystical and military interests.  The Nine Principles went through several iterations; Fuller stated that "the system evolved from six principles in 1912, rose to eight in 1915, to, virtually, nineteen in 1923, and then descended to nine in 1925".  For example, notice how his analysis of General Ulysses S. Grant was presented in 1929.

The United States Army modified Fuller's list and issued its first list of the principles of war in 1921, making it the basis of advanced training for officers into the 1990s, when it finally reconceptualised its training.

The Nine Principles of War
The Nine Principles involve the uses of force (combat power).  They have been expressed in various ways, but Fuller's 1925 arrangement is as follows:

 Direction: What is the overall aim? Which objectives must be met to achieve the aim?
 Concentration: Where will the commander focus the most effort?
 Distribution: Where and how will the commander position their force?
 Determination: The will to fight, the will to persevere, and the will to win must be maintained.
 Surprise (Demoralisation of Force): The commander's ability to veil their intentions while discovering those of their enemy. Properly executed Surprise unbalances the enemy – causing Demoralisation of Force.
 Endurance: The force's resistance to pressure. This is measured by the force's ability to anticipate complications and threats. This is enhanced by planning on how best to avoid, overcome, or negate them and then properly educating and training the force in these methods.
 Mobility: The commander's ability to manoeuvre their force while outmanoeuvring the enemy's forces.
 Offensive Action (Disorganisation of Force): The ability to gain and maintain the initiative in combat. Properly executed Offensive Action disrupts the enemy - causing Disorganisation of Force.
 Security: The ability to protect the force from threats.

Triads and Trichotomies
Cabalistic influences on his theories can be evidenced by his use of the "Law of Threes" throughout his work.  Fuller didn't believe the Principles stood alone as is thought today, but that they complemented and overlapped each other as part of a whole, forming the Law of Economy of Force.

Organisation of Force
These Principles were further grouped into the categories of Control (command / co-operation), Pressure (attack / activity) and Resistance (protection / stability).  The Principles of Control guides the dual Principles of Pressure and of Resistance, which in turn create the Principles of Control.
 Principles of Control (1, 4, & 7): Direction, Determination, & Mobility.
 Principles of Pressure (2, 5, & 8): Concentration, Surprise, & Offensive Action.
 Principles of Resistance (3, 6, & 9): Distribution, Endurance, & Security.

The Unity of the Principles of War
They were also grouped into Cosmic (Spiritual), Mental (Mind / Thought / Reason), Moral (Soul / Sensations / Emotions), and Physical (Body / Musculature / Action) Spheres, in which two Principles (like the double-edged point of an arrowhead) combine to create or manifest a third, which in turn guides the first and second Principles (like the fletches on an arrow's tail).  Each Sphere leads to the creation of the next until it returns to the beginning and repeats the circular cycle with reassessments of the Object and Objective to redefine the uses of Force. The Cosmic Sphere is seen as outside the other three Spheres, like the Heavens are outside the Realm of Man.  They influence it indirectly in ways that cannot be controlled by the commander, but they are a factor in the use of Force.  Force resides in the center of the pattern, as all of these elements revolve around it.
 Cosmic Sphere: Goal (Object) & Desire (Objective) =  Method (Economy of Force)
 Goal is the overall purpose or aim of the mission (what Goals must the mission complete or achieve?).
 Desire concerns the priority of the achievement or acquisition of the Goal (how important and essential is the Goal to the overall mission effort?). 
 Method is how the forces available will carry out the mission (How much of the mission's force will be assigned - or are available – to accomplish the Goal?). 
 Mental Sphere (1, 2, & 3): Reason (Direction) & Imagination (Concentration) = Will (Distribution)
 Moral Sphere (4, 5, & 6):  Fear (Determination)  & Morale (Surprise) = Courage (Endurance)
 Physical Sphere (7, 8, & 9): Attack (Offensive Action) & Protection (Security) = Movement (Mobility)

These Principles of War have been adopted and further refined by the military forces of several nations, most notably within NATO, and continue to be applied widely to modern strategic thinking. Recently they have also been applied to business tactics and hobby wargaming.

Lectures on Field Service Regulations III (1932)
Fuller also had a knack for aphorisms, witness: "To attack the nerves of an army, and through its nerves the will of its commander, is more profitable than battering to pieces the bodies of its men." His Lectures have attracted much attention over the course of decades, with one staff writer even going so far as to extend his vision of the tank as "master-weapon" to say that the helicopter not the tank would be the chief determinant of success on the battlefield from the late 20th century.

The book was carefully read by General Heinz Guderian of later Blitzkrieg fame and at the time Germany's foremost tank expert. The Soviet Army initially issued 30,000 copies of it and designated it as a table book for all Red Army officers. Later, the Soviets increased publication to 100,000 volumes. In Czechoslovakia, it became the standard reference for the teaching of mechanized warfare at their staff college. Ironically, in Britain only 500 copies were sold by 1935 while in the United States, the Infantry Journal received a copy at the time of publishing but failed to review it.

Armament and History (1945)
Fuller also developed the idea of the Constant Tactical Factor.  This states that every improvement in warfare is checked by a counter-improvement, causing the advantage to shift back and forth between the offensive and the defensive.  Fuller's firsthand experience in the First World War saw a shift from the defensive power of the machine gun to the offensive power of the tank.

Magic and mysticism
Fuller had an occultist side that oddly mixed with his military side.  He was an early disciple of English poet and magician Aleister Crowley, and was very familiar with his and other forms of magick and mysticism.  While serving in the First Oxfordshire Light Infantry he had entered and won a contest to write the best review of Crowley's poetic works, after which it turned out that he was the only entrant.  This essay was later published in book form in 1907 as The Star in the West.  After this he became an enthusiastic supporter of Crowley, joining his magical order, the A∴A∴., within which he became a leading member, editing order documents and its journal, The Equinox. During this period he wrote The Treasure House of Images, edited early sections of Crowley's magical autobiography The Temple of Solomon the King and produced highly regarded paintings dealing with A∴A∴ teachings: these paintings have been used in recent years as the covers of the journal's revival, The Equinox, Volume IV.

After the April 1911 Jones vs. The Looking Glass case, in which a great deal was made of Aleister Crowley's bisexuality (although Crowley himself was not a party to the case), Fuller became worried that his association with Crowley might be a hindrance to his career.  Crowley writes in chapter 67 of his book, The Confessions of Aleister Crowley:

After this, contact between the two men faded rapidly. The front pages of the 1913 issues of the Equinox (Volume 1, nos. 9 and 10), which gave general directions to A∴A∴ members, included a notice on the subject of Fuller, who was described as a "former Probationer"; the notice disparaged Fuller's magical accomplishments and warned A∴A∴ members to accept no magical training from him.  However, Fuller continued to be fascinated with occult subjects and in later years he would write about topics such as the Qabalah and yoga. During the mid-1940s, Charles Richard Cammell (author of Aleister Crowley: The Man, The Mage, The Poet) met with Fuller and reported his views about Crowley: "I have heard an eminent personage, General J.F.C. Fuller, a man famous in arms and letters, one who has known the greatest statesmen, warriors, dictators, of our age, declare solemnly that the most extraordinary genius he ever knew was Crowley."  After the Second World War and Crowley's death, Fuller wrote a letter to Edward Noel FitzGerald stating: "Crowley was a genuine avatar, but I don't think he knew it, but I do think he senses it in an emotional way." (17 September 1949)

Works
Fuller was a prolific writer and published 45+ books.

Books on Occultism
 The Star in The West: A Critical Essay Upon the Works of Aleister Crowley (London: Walter Scott Publishing Co., 1907) read online
 Yoga: A Study of the Mystical Philosophy of the Brahmins and Buddhists (London: W. Rider, 1925)
 Atlantis, America and the Future. (London: Kegan Paul, 1925)
 Pegasus (New York: E.P. Dutton and Company, 1926)
 The Secret Wisdom of the Qabalah: A Study in Jewish Mystical Thought (London: W. Rider & Co., 1937) read online

Books on Warfare
 Tanks in the Great War, 1914-1918 (New York: E.P. Dutton and Company, 1920) read online
 The Reformation of War (London: Hutchinson and Company, 1923) read online
 The Foundations of the Science of War. (London: Hutchinson and Company, 1926) read online
 On Future Warfare (London: Sifton, Praed & Company, 1928)
 India in Revolt (London: Eyre & Spottiswood, 1931) read online
 The Dragon's Teeth: A Study of War and Peace (London: Constable and Company, 1932) read online
 Lectures on Field Service Regulations III (1932) analysis
 The First of the League Wars: A Study of the Abyssinian War, Its Lessons and Omens (London: Eyre and Spottiswoode, 1936) read online
 Generalship: Its Diseases and Their Cure: A Study of the Personal Factor in Command (Harrisburg, Pennsylvania: Military Service Publishing Company, 1936) read online
 Machine Warfare: An Enquiry into the Influence of Mechanics on the Art of War (London: Hutchinson, 1942)
 Warfare Today; How Modern Battles are Planned and Fought on Land, at Sea, and in the Air - joint editors: J.F.C. Fuller, Admiral Sir Reginald Bacon, and Air Marshal Sir Patrick Playfair (London: Odham's Press Ltd., 1944) read online
 Armament and History: The Influence of Armament on History from the Dawn of Classical Warfare to the End of the Second World War (London: Charles Scribner's Sons, 1945) 
 The Second World War, 1939-1945: A Strategical and Tactical History (Eyre & Spottiswoode, London, 1948) 
 The Decisive Battles of the Western World and Their Influence upon History (3 vols.) (London: Eyre & Spottiswoode, 1954–1956).  A 2-volume edition, abridged by John Terraine to omit battles outside the European continent, was published in 1970 by Picador; not to be confused with the original edition of 1939–40, also in two volumes, of which the 3-volume edition is a substantial revision, as described in its preface.  The U.S. ed. is A Military History of the Western World (3 vols.) (New York: Funk and Wagnalls, New York, 1954–1957); Republished by Da Capo Press, New York, 1987–8. 
 Volume 1: From the Earliest Times to the Battle of Lepanto
 Volume 2: From the Defeat of the Spanish Armada to the Battle of Waterloo
 Volume 3: From the American Civil War to the End of the Second World War The Conduct of War, 1789-1961: A Study of the Impact of the French, Industrial, and Russian Revolutions on War and Its Conduct (Rutgers University Press, 1961) 
 v. 1; .
 v. 2; .
 v. 3; .
Biography
 The Generalship of Ulysses S. Grant (London: John Murray, 1929)
 Grant & Lee: A Study in Personality and Generalship (London: Eyre & Spottiswoode, 1933) read online
 Memoirs of an Unconventional Soldier (London: Nicholson & Watson, 1936) read online
 The Generalship of Alexander the Great (London: Eyre & Spottiswoode, 1958).
 Julius Caesar: Man, Soldier and Tyrant (Eyre & Spottiswoode, London, 1965) 

 

Notes

 Further reading 
 Gat, Azar.  Fascist and Liberal Visions of War: Fuller, Liddell Hart, Douhet, and Other Modernists (1998)
 Harris, J. P. Men, Ideas, and Tanks: British Military Thought and Armoured Forces, 1903-1939 (Manchester University Press, 1995).
 Higham, Robin D. The military intellectuals in Britain, 1918-1939 (Rutgers University Press, 1966).
 Holden Reid, Brian. J.F.C. Fuller: Military Thinker (1987) 
 Larson, Robert H. The British Army and the Theory of Armored Warfare, 1918-1940 (U of Delaware Press, 1984).
 Luvaas, Jay.  The Education of an Army: British Military Thought, 1815–1940 (U of Chicago Press. 1964) Pp. xi, 454.
 Messenger, Charles, ed. Reader's Guide to Military History (2001), pp 182-84; Historiography
  
 Searle, D. A. "Churchill-By a highly critical contemporary: JFC Fuller's assessment of Winston Churchill as grand strategist, 1939-1945." Global War Studies 12.2 (2015).
 Trythall, A.J. "Boney" Fuller: The Intellectual General'' (London, 1977)
  the chapter on Fuller is available as a downloadable PDF

External links

 
 

For examples of the use of Fuller's campaign theories in the business world see:
 "How to Apply Military Principles to High Value Sales Campaigns,"
For examples of Fuller's occult books and pamphlets see:
 "A.'.A.'. The J.F.C Fuller Collection,"
For examples of Fuller's fascist essays and pamphlets see:
 "Fascism and War"
 "March to Sanity"
 "The Fascist Attitude to War"

1876 births
1966 deaths
British Army major generals
English military writers
English occult writers
English Thelemites
English fascists
Commanders of the Order of the British Empire
Companions of the Order of the Bath
Companions of the Distinguished Service Order
History of the tank
People from Chichester
British Army personnel of the Second Boer War
British Army personnel of World War I
Historians of the American Civil War
Occultism in Nazism
People educated at Malvern College
Graduates of the Royal Military College, Sandhurst
Oxfordshire and Buckinghamshire Light Infantry officers
Graduates of the Staff College, Camberley
British Union of Fascists politicians
Academics of the Staff College, Camberley
Military personnel from Sussex